"Foolish Pride" is a song written and recorded by American country music singer Travis Tritt. It was released in March 1994 as the first single from his album Ten Feet Tall and Bulletproof.  The song peaked at Number One on the U.S. country singles charts in July 1994, becoming the fourth Number One hit of his career.

Content
"Foolish Pride" is a mid-tempo ballad detailing a failed relationship, in which both halves are afraid to show each other their feelings out of pride.

Critical reception
Reviewing Ten Feet Tall and Bulletproof for Allmusic, Brian Mansfield cited "Foolish Pride" as a standout track, saying that it "rival[s] 'Anymore' for power and Skynyrd and Bob Seger for production values." Rolling Stone critic Jim Bessman also described the song favorably in his review of the album, calling it "a power ballad that shows that Tritt can be as tender and compassionate as [Randy] Travis." Deborah Evans Price, of Billboard magazine reviewed the song favorably, saying that Tritt "delivers a big message about the little fights that turn into huge irreconcilable differences." She goes on to call it "another solid song, and a welcome sentiment at a time when everybody seems to be reaching for the gun."

Music video
The music video was directed by Gustavo Garzon and premiered in mid-1994.

It features a "ghost" (Travis Tritt) admonishing the couple to come together, rather than succumb to "foolish pride",

Chart performance
"Foolish Pride" was released in early 1994. In July of the same year, it reached the top of the country singles charts in both U.S. and Canada, becoming his fourth U.S. Number One. It was also his last Number One until he topped the charts again in 2000 with "Best of Intentions".

Year-end charts

References

1994 singles
1994 songs
Travis Tritt songs
Songs written by Travis Tritt
Warner Records Nashville singles